Honesty is the human quality of communicating and acting truthfully and with fairness.

Honesty or honest may also refer to:

Places
Honesty, Ohio, a community in the United States

Arts, entertainment, and media

Music

Albums
Honest (Future album), 2014
Honest (soundtrack), the soundtrack to the film by David A. Stewart
Honest (Dave Stewart and the Spiritual Cowboys album), 1991
Honesty (Rodney Atkins album), a 2003 album by Rodney Atkins
"Honesty (Write Me a List)", a single from Rodney Atkins' 2003 album
Honesty (Curtis Mayfield album), 1983
Honesty (Alex Parks album), a 2005 album by Alex Parks
Honesty (Jaya album), 1999

Songs
"Honest" (Chainsmokers song)
"Honesty" (Editors song), 2013
"Honest" (Future song)
"Honesty" (Billy Joel song), 1979
"Honest" (Kodaline song)
"Honesty" (Alex Parks song), 2006
"Honest" (Shawn Mendes song)
"Honest", song by Band of Skulls from 2009 album Baby Darling Doll Face Honey	
"Honest", a song by Bazzi from the 2018 album Cosmic
"Honest", a song by Rachael Lampa from the album Rachael Lampa
"Honest", a song by The Long Winters from the 2006 album Putting the Days to Bed
"Honest", a song by Lisa Stansfield from the 1997 album Lisa Stansfield
"Honest", a song by The Verve Pipe from the 1993 album Pop Smear
"Honesty", a song by Sara Groves from the 2007 album Tell Me What You Know

Television
Honest (TV series), a UK remake of the New Zealand TV series Outrageous Fortune
Honesto, a 2013 Philippine television drama

Other uses in arts, entertainment, and media
Honest (film), a 2000 film featuring members of All Saints
 Honesty, a publication of the late nineteenth century Melbourne Anarchist Club

Plants
Honesty, a common name for plants in the genus Lunaria
Lunaria annua, a flowering plant with decorative disc-shaped seedpods, also called honesty or annual honesty

Other uses
Honest, short name for The Honest Company
Honesty, a racehorse that finished unplaced in the 1842 Grand National

See also
Honestly (disambiguation)
Honestus (disambiguation)